The 2016 Goody's Fast Relief 500 was a NASCAR Sprint Cup Series race that was held on October 30, 2016, at Martinsville Speedway in Ridgeway, Virginia. Contested over 500 laps on the .526 mile (.847 km) short track, it was the 33rd race of the 2016 NASCAR Sprint Cup Series season, seventh race of the Chase and first race of the Round of 8.

The race marked the final career start for Jeff Gordon, exactly one year after winning this race.

Report

Background

Martinsville Speedway is an International Speedway Corporation-owned NASCAR stock car racing track located in Henry County, in Ridgeway, Virginia, just to the south of Martinsville. At  in length, it is the shortest track in the NASCAR Sprint Cup Series. The track was also one of the first paved oval tracks in NASCAR, being built in 1947 by H. Clay Earles. It is also the only race track that has been on the NASCAR circuit from its beginning in 1948. Along with this, Martinsville is the only NASCAR oval track on the entire NASCAR track circuit to have asphalt surfaces on the straightaways, then concrete to cover the turns.

Entry list

First practice

Qualifying

He said afterwards that Martinsville "is just so tough, and that first pit stall is just so critical to having a shot at winning here. I would love to get my first grandfather clock (the winner’s trophy). After last week, this helps a little bit. All in all, just proud of the guys for coming here with a game plan and executing. It's no guarantee that we'll race well on Sunday, but it's definitely a nice advantage if you have a good race car to be able to make up spots on pit road and not have to worry about getting blocked in and all those things. It's a definite advantage, and hopefully we can have a good car to take advantage of it."

Joey Logano, who qualified second, said he came so very "close to getting that fourth pole in a row. It would have been pretty cool to be able to say you did that, but it’s been a great streak.”

Ricky Stenhouse Jr. – who "wheel-hopped" going into turn 1, spun out, damaged the car and rolled out his backup – said there was "a lot of wheel-hop. It was definitely not ideal in qualifying, but you're always pressing the issue to try to qualify better and trying to get everything out of the car that you can and it just started wheel-hopping. As a lot of us drivers know, once it starts wheel-hopping it's hard to save. I down-shifted to try and keep it out of the wall as best I could, but we weren't able to do that. We'll get this Fastenal back-up out and get to work on it tonight and make sure that we have it ready to go for practice tomorrow.”

Qualifying results

Practice (post-qualifying)

Second practice

Final practice

Race

First half
Under mostly cloudy Virginia skies, Martin Truex Jr. led the field to the green flag at 1:18 p.m. The first caution of the race flew on lap 22 after Ricky Stenhouse Jr. wheel-hopped and backed into the turn 3 wall. He went on to finish 40th. Joey Logano exited pit road first. Carl Edwards and Denny Hamlin were sent to the tail end of the field on the restart for speeding.

The race restarted on lap 28. Truex took the lead back from Logano on lap 45. The second caution flew on lap 61 for David Ragan laying fluid down on the track.

The race restarted on lap 68. Kyle Larson took the lead for six laps on lap 73 before Truex took it back on lap 79. Kyle Busch took the lead on lap 113 before giving it back to Truex the following lap. Debris in turn 4 brought out the third caution on lap 132. Kevin Harvick was sent to the tail end of the field for speeding.

The race restarted on lap 139. Matt Kenseth took the lead for a circuit on lap 152 before Truex took back over the following lap. He continued to hold it until Kenseth took it from him for good on lap 180. Racing for second, Hamlin made contact with Jimmie Johnson by bumping him out of the way rounding turns 3 and 4 before continuing on lap 198. In his post-race media availability, Hamlin explained his bump on Johnson by saying how they "were racing for 13th or something at New Hampshire and he turned us, luckily I saved it. [He] [n]early wrecked us there. I raced him hard for the lead at Charlotte and then we come here and I catch him from a really long ways back. They didn’t want to let us go. It was frustrating from my standpoint, so I had to move him out of the way. I gave him many warnings on the radio.’’ Johnson said afterwards in his availability that he was "puzzled that he had to move me like he did,” Johnson said. “I prefer to race people cleanly. I got accused of racing hard? I'll take that as a compliment.” Debris on the backstretch, a torn banner, brought out the fourth caution on lap 200.

Second half

The race restarted on lap 207. It ran the length of a full fuel run, which is rare at Martinsville, and a number of cars pitted under green, also rare at Martinsville, when Edwards cut a tire, slammed the wall in turn and brought out the fifth caution with 142 laps to go. He said afterwards that Goodyear had "come down here, look at the tire, and said it was a belt failure," Edwards said. "So that’s really big of them to say, 'Hey, there’s nothing you could have done about it.' We had a really good race going and sometimes that’s just what happens in racing." Hamlin was sorted out as the leader. Because this happened during a cycle of green flag stops, it caused a number of cars to be in the wrong order when the race was scheduled to restart with 127 to go. There was controversy with race control taking so long to sort out the running order and for allowing so many laps to click off (29 total under the caution period) instead of throwing the red flag and sorting the running order. “We don't need 100 laps under yellow ... trying to figure out where they're at. It probably cost us the race," said Keselowski after the race. Following the race, Sprint Cup Series Managing Director Richard Buck said what happened "was a very dynamic situation; it was unique, as you saw. We were right in the middle of green flag pit stops and we had to go to a caution. That presents one set of issues that we deal with and then from that point as it moved along and we started to get the lineup as we normally do, it went to another dynamic when we had the leader run out of fuel. ... We understand the stakes of the Chase. They're extremely high for everybody. Our job is to get it right. We've got a tremendous amount of resources up there (in the tower). We then moved into another dynamic of it, the wave-arounds. We took our time to make sure we got it right; we feel confident that we got it right."

The race eventually restarted with 114 to go. After two laps of side-by-side racing, Johnson passed Hamlin exiting turn 2 to take the lead with 91 to go. Keselowski worked his way past Busch, Kenseth and Hamlin to move into second, but ran out of time to run down Johnson who drove on to score the victory.

Post-race

Driver comments
Johnson said in victory lane that "there were a lot of moments but anything in life you have to work for it. It's not going to come easy and we knew that coming into this race. There are so many challenges with this track. I'm so thankful for this race team. To win on this weekend at this track with the tragedy we had in ’04, we’re thinking of all the loved ones that we lost in the plane crash.”

Keselowski, who finished runner-up, said his race "was a good day for us, not the win. I think we had the speed capable to pull it off, but still a really strong day. The car was good. The team executed really well, we just kind of missed out on the racing Gods today. We have a lot to be proud of, a great effort, and showed that we’re still a strong team if not the strongest in the garage and I’m really proud of that.”

Finishing third, Hamlin said his day was solid, "but obviously not what we were looking for. I knew when they called it that I sped. It wasn't like I was rolling too fast, it was exiting my pit box. I got jammed up by whoever was in front of me, there were cars on the outside and I was trying to gas to get clear of them and then back off. With these shorter sections I didn't have time to get it back.”

Finishing fourth, Kenseth said he "had a good day, not a great day. The guy doing a great day is the guy doing a burnout. We had a great car, we just got a caution when we didn’t need one – we were on pit road and then at the end when we needed a caution, I saw a car hit the wall and a car smoking so I was hoping to get another yellow and get a shot at it, but just didn’t get it.”

"You can't wreck each other and that's all there is to it I guess. We worked so good together that we gave the 48 car the win today,” a frustrated Busch said. "We had a great M&M’s Camry and we could have been a little farther up front, but we were held up there and we couldn’t pass and if I did try to make moves or try to make a pass, I got cutoff.”

Jeff Gordon, who finished sixth in his final substitute ride in the No. 88 car, said that "like Homestead, you don't really know how special some of those moments are until years down the road. Maybe that's just my personality when I can reflect on it, go back through my career. This has really done a lot for me integrating into the team and the organization. ... It's memorable, certainly. It's ironic this is the last one."

Off-track incident
Around an hour following the race, a vehicle struck and injured 22 pedestrians in a handicapped parking lot next to the helipad outside turns 1 and 2. According to bystanders and police reports, the vehicle involved (a Chevrolet SSR) attempted to pass a Jeep Patriot, struck the Jeep and hit nearby pedestrians. The driver was taken into custody.

Race results

Race summary
 Lead changes: 9 among different drivers
 Cautions/Laps: 5 for 54
 Red flags: 0
 Time of race: 3 hours, 20 minutes and 55 seconds
 Average speed:

Media

Television
NBCSN covered the race on the television side. Rick Allen, Jeff Burton and Steve Letarte called the race in the booth with a guest appearance by Dale Earnhardt Jr. Dave Burns, Mike Massaro, Marty Snider and Kelli Stavast handled pit road on the television side.

Radio
MRN covered the radio call for the race, which was simulcast on Sirius XM NASCAR Radio.

Standings after the race

Drivers' Championship standings

Manufacturers' Championship standings

Note: Only the first 16 positions are included for the driver standings.

References

2016 in sports in Virginia
2016 NASCAR Sprint Cup Series
NASCAR races at Martinsville Speedway
October 2016 sports events in the United States